K.S. Garbarnia Kraków is a Polish football and sports club from Ludwinów, a historical district of the city of Kraków. The club's name comes from the nearby tannery of the Dłużyński brothers, which was the original club sponsor. Garbarnia currently plays in II liga (third tier of Polish football).

History 

Founded in 1921, Garbarnia's best years were the late 1920s and early 1930s. In 1928, after winning both regional and national qualifiers, the team was promoted to the Polish Football League. Then, in 1929, after an excellent campaign, they finished second to champions Warta Poznan, thus cementing their position as one of the top teams in Poland.

In 1931 Garbarnia went one better, becoming Polish Champions. Containing little home-grown talent, the Kraków starting lineup consisted of players brought in from other clubs. Among the top players were Otto Riesner and Karol Pazurek (both the natives of Katowice), and both of whom played for the Polish national team.

In 1937, after 9 years in the top division, Garbarnia were relegated. They returned in 1939, in a season cut short by the outbreak of World War II.

After the Second World War Garbarnia never regained its status, playing mainly in the Polish Second Division, occasionally managing to win promotion to the First Division, only to be relegated after a year or two. 1957 was the team's final year in the First Division and since then, Garbarnia have never made it back. Worst was yet to come, as in 1971 the team was relegated to the Third division, the Regional Kraków district league.

In 2018, Garbarnia returned to Polish First League (2nd tier) after a 44-year absence. Garbarnia secured promotion after promotion/relegation play-off win over Pogoń Siedlce. In 2019, the club was again relegated to II liga.

Honours 

Ekstraklasa:
Winners (1): 1931

Current squad

References

External links 
 Official website
 Fans' Association website

Association football clubs established in 1921
1921 establishments in Poland
Football clubs in Kraków